Serenity is the second studio album by German Eurodance band Culture Beat, released in 1993. It includes the single "Mr. Vain", which topped the charts across Europe and in Australia.

Background
The line-up of Culture Beat changed slightly from their previous album released two years earlier, with Tania Evans becoming the new singer, joining Jay Supreme who remained the rapper. A total of five singles were released from the album: "Mr. Vain", "Got to Get It", "Anything", "World in Your Hands" and "Adelante".

The album won the 1993 Echo award for Most Successful German Album Abroad which is the highest German music industry award. It went on to sell almost two million copies worldwide.

Critical reception
AllMusic editor William Cooper opined that "Serenity is an okay listen, albeit a repetitious one. "Got to Get It" is a virtual rewrite of "Mr. Vain", and the beat-heavy tracks "World in Your Hands" and "The Other Side of Me" are unremarkable but competent and entertaining. Serenity may lack substance, but the album should please fans of pleasant, non-threatening dance music." James Muretich from Calgary Herald commented, "Culture Beat has co-ruled the dance clubs with hit after hit after hit recently and Serenity gathers them together, including its recent "Mr. Vain" smash, adds some new tunes and, presto, it`s dance party time. A tight, techno, soulful serving of dance grooves, raps and singing, Culture Beat easily ranks a notch above its beats-per-minute competitors." Alan Jones from Music Week wrote that "Germany's latest hitmakers make their album debut, which simply proves the huge debt they owe to fellow countrymen Snap." He felt that "there's little of distinction here with none of the tracks sounding likely to eraulate the singles success of "Mr. Vain"."

Track listing

Charts

Weekly charts

Year-end charts

Certifications

References

1993 albums
Culture Beat albums